Santika Indonesia Hotels & Resorts is one of the largest hotel chains in Indonesia and managed under PT Grahawita Santika, a subsidiary of mass media conglomerate Kompas Gramedia. It was established on August 22, 1981 and has over 40 hotels across Indonesia. Since 2006, the company has changed its strategy based on market segmentation and divided its brands into The Royal Collection, Hotel Santika Premiere, Hotel Santika, and Amaris Hotel.

History
PT Grahawita Santika was established to manage the hospitality industry under Kompas Gramedia Group on August 22, 1981. Hotel Soeti was the first hotel purchased from its owner, Soetiyah Pudjosuwarno. This hotel is on Jalan Sumatra No. 52-54, Bandung. In 1988, this simple hotel, with 33 rooms built in an area of 3,250 square meters, was renovated into 70 rooms. Once the renovation was completed, this hotel was inaugurated as the 3-star Hotel Santika Bandung by the Minister of Tourism, Post and Telecommunications, Susilo Sudarman on March 27, 1989. Hotel Santika Bandung was the forerunner to the establishment of Santika Indonesia Hotels & Resorts.

The background of the establishment of Hotel Santika, the Kompas daily newspaper, was suppressed in 1978; therefore, the pioneers of Kompas Gramedia Group should think about the business diversification outside its core business as a communication media. They made the plan in order to prevent mass layoffs. If the Kompas daily newspaper will be suppressed again, there are subsidiaries, which can sustain their employees. Several businesses were implemented, including the hospitality industry.

At the beginning, the proposal for establishing a hotel was not approved, because at that time, hotel business was considered a negative connotation and the Return on Investment (ROI) was progressing slowly. However, Binawarman Sardjan, who was a member on the investment team of Kompas Gramedia Group at that time, convinced the Chairman of the investment team of Kompas Gramedia Group, Indra Gunawan, to approve the proposal. Because of the persistence and hard work of Binawarman Sardjan, Hotel Santika was established.

Several years after the first Santika Hotel was inaugurated, Santika Indonesia Hotels & Resorts developed itself and reached about 40 properties across Indonesia. In accordance with its brand value, "Indonesian Home" and the service motto, "Hospitality from the Heart", Santika Indonesia Hotels & Resorts always emphasizes the value of Indonesian culture, including the hospitality to all guests.

Hotels and resorts
Currently, Santika Indonesia Hotels & Resorts has four brands across Indonesia: The Royal Collection, Hotel Santika Premiere, Hotel Santika, and Amaris Hotel.

References

External links
 
 Amaris Hotel Indonesia

Hospitality companies of Indonesia
Hotel chains in Indonesia
Hotels established in 1981
Indonesian brands
Kompas Gramedia Group